Jeremy Bates (born January 12, 1974) is an American professional boxer. Nicknamed "The Beast", Bates was a moderately successful fighter who fought several other journeyman fighters of his era. Bates has become something of a "comeback" opponent for veteran fighters such as Holyfield, Golota, and Meehan.

Professional boxing career

Early career
Bates turned professional in 1999 and fought mainly journeyman fighters, losing to prospect Andre Purlette in 2001.  Bates later lost to Sedreck Fields, Kirk Johnson, Leo Nolan, Brian Minto, and Ray Austin before his first retirement.

The Evander Holyfield fight
Bates was persuaded to postpone his retirement when he was given an opportunity to fight four-time heavyweight champion Evander Holyfield. On August 18, 2006, in a 10-round bout at the American Airlines Center in Dallas, Texas, 44-year-old Holyfield dominated the fight which was stopped in the second round after he landed around 20 consecutive punches on Bates. The events prior to, and the fight itself, are documented in Evander Holyfield's book 'Becoming Holyfield'.

Retirement from boxing
Bates retired with a record of 21 wins, 13 losses and 1 draw, with 18 wins by knockout.  Post boxing, Bates began a successful career as a full-time insurance sales professional.  Bates is currently employed at the United States Enrichment Corporation. (USEC) is a Uranium gaseous diffusion plant in Portsmouth OH.

Coming out of retirement
Bates would come out of retirement to face Guillermo Jones, Andrew Golota, Odlanier Solis, Kevin Rainey, and most recently Kali Meehan.  All of those fights, with the exception of Bates' bout with Kevin Rainey, would be losses. Currently, Bates' record stands at 23 wins, 17 losses and 1 draw, with 19 wins by knockout.

Professional boxing record

Professional wrestling
Bates made his professional wrestling debut on November 15, 2008, in Ashland, Kentucky, at Ohio Championship Wrestling's November Reign, where he defeated Vinnie Viagra. He defeated "The Driller" Eddie Browning on December 13 at OCW's Season's Beatings.

Bates got his third victory at OCW on January 10, 2009, at the New Year's Bash by defeating NWA All-Star Wrestling Heavyweight Champion "Pretty Boy" Stan Lee. Bates made his wrestling debut at an arena where he is undefeated in the boxing ranks, the Veterans Memorial Fieldhouse in Huntington, West Virginia, at 304 Wrestling's Battlefront. He defeated Vinnie Viagra in that outing.

Bates is now in training to fight in the Ultimate Fighting Championship.  His progress is being documented in a YouTube series called "Being the Beast".

References

External links

ESPN Article on Bates

1974 births
Living people
Boxers from Kentucky
Heavyweight boxers
American male boxers